Hirab or 'Hiraab may refer to:

 Hiraab, a Somali clan
 The Hiraab Imamate and surrounding areas in Somalia
 Hirab, a village in Lorestan, western Iran

See also
Harab
Harib (disambiguation)
Hira (disambiguation)
Horeb (disambiguation)
Hurab